Merly Mimara Hernández Morales (born 16 September 1991) is a Nicaraguan footballer who plays as a midfielder for the Nicaragua women's national team.

Club career
Hernández has played for Diriangén FC in Nicaragua.

International career
Hernández capped for Nicaragua at senior level during the 2010 CONCACAF Women's World Cup Qualifying qualification and two Central American and Caribbean Games editions (2010 and 2014).

References 

1991 births
Living people
Nicaraguan women's footballers
Women's association football midfielders
Nicaragua women's international footballers
Central American Games silver medalists for Nicaragua
Central American Games medalists in football